Gonzalo Luis Belloso (born 30 March 1974 in Rosario) is an Argentine football striker. He is currently without a club having been released by Rosario Central of the Primera Division Argentina in July 2008.

Belloso had three spells with Argentine clubs Lanús (where he won the 1996 Copa CONMEBOL) and Rosario Central. In Argentina, he also played for Racing Club de Avellaneda and Colón de Santa Fe.

Belloso also played for a number of clubs outside Argentina, Cobreloa in Chile, RC Strasbourg in France, Cruz Azul in Mexico, Olimpia in Paraguay and Zamora CF in Spain.

External links
 Argentine Primera statistics
Statistics at Football-Lineups

1974 births
Living people
Footballers from Rosario, Santa Fe
Argentine footballers
Argentine expatriate footballers
Association football forwards
Rosario Central footballers
Club Atlético Lanús footballers
Cobreloa footballers
RC Strasbourg Alsace players
Racing Club de Avellaneda footballers
Club Atlético Colón footballers
Club Olimpia footballers
Zamora CF footballers
Expatriate footballers in Chile
Expatriate footballers in Mexico
Expatriate footballers in France
Expatriate footballers in Paraguay
Expatriate footballers in Spain
Argentine Primera División players
Ligue 1 players
Argentine expatriate sportspeople in France
Argentine expatriate sportspeople in Mexico
Argentine expatriate sportspeople in Spain